Gurak-e Soleymani (also Romanized as Gūrak-e Soleymānī) is a village in Delvar Rural District, Delvar District, Tangestan County, Bushehr Province, Iran. At the 2006 census, its population was 240, in 57 families.

References 

Populated places in Tangestan County